Gümüşçay (former ) is a town (belde) in the Biga District, Çanakkale Province, Turkey. Its population is 2,123 (2021). The settlement was an Ottoman district center named Güvercinli. The mosque of Gümüşçay, the Nasuh Çelebi mosque was built during the reign of Mahmut I (1730-1754). The settlement was declared a seat of township in 1949. The main economic sector of the town is agriculture.

References

Populated places in Çanakkale Province
Towns in Turkey
Biga District